Tachyrhynchus is a genus of sea snails, marine gastropod mollusks in the family Turritellidae.

Species
Species within the genus Tachyrhynchus include:

 Tachyrhynchus erosus (Couthouy, 1838)
 Tachyrhynchus pratomus Dall, 1919
 Tachyrhynchus reticulatus (Mighels & Adams, 1842)
 Tachyrhynchus septemcostatus Golikov, 1986
 Tachyrhynchus ventricosus Golikov, 1986

References

External links

Turritellidae